The discography of The Sword, an American heavy metal band, consists of six studio albums, one live album, three compilation albums, one extended play (EP), three split releases, 13 singles and ten music videos. Originally formed in Austin, Texas in 2003 by vocalist and guitarist John D. Cronise with guitarist Kyle Shutt, bassist Bryan Richie and drummer Trivett Wingo, the band signed with Kemado Records in 2005 and released debut album Age of Winters the following year. "Freya" was released as a single in 2007, followed by a split EP with Swedish band Witchcraft featuring new track "Sea of Spears" and a cover version of Led Zeppelin's "Immigrant Song".

In 2008 the band released Gods of the Earth, which reached number 102 on the US Billboard 200. "Fire Lances of the Ancient Hyperzephyrians" was released as its sole single. In March 2010, the band released a split single with Year Long Disaster, which was followed in August by Warp Riders. The album was supported by the release of two singles – "Tres Brujas" and "(The Night the Sky Cried) Tears of Fire" – as well as a trilogy of music videos. Warp Riders peaked at number 42 on the Billboard 200, as well as reaching the top ten of the Hard Rock Albums, Independent Albums and Tastemaker Albums charts.

With new drummer Santiago "Jimmy" Vela III and new label Razor & Tie, the Sword returned with its fourth studio album Apocryphon in October 2012. It was the band's first to reach the US top 20, peaking at number 17, as well as the first to reach the top ten of the Top Rock Albums chart at a peak position of number 4. The band's fifth album High Country was released in August 2015, charting in the US at number 30, with the acoustic companion album Low Country released the following year reaching the top ten of the US Billboard Hard Rock Albums chart. The Sword's first live album Greetings From... was released in May 2017.

In March 2018, the band released its sixth studio album Used Future. The album debuted at number 104 on the Billboard 200, the lowest position in the band's career since Age of Winters had failed to chart. It also reached number 6 on the Hard Rock Albums chart and number 16 on the Top Rock Albums chart. After a two-year hiatus, the Sword is set to return in 2020 with two compilations: Conquest of Kingdoms and Chronology: 2006–2018.

Albums

Studio albums

Live albums

Compilations

Extended plays

Split releases

Singles

Music videos

References

External links
The Sword official website
The Sword discography at AllMusic
The Sword discography at Discogs
The Sword discography at MusicBrainz

Heavy metal group discographies
Discographies of American artists